Region XIII (Spanish: Región 13. Toluca) is an intrastate region within the State of Mexico, one of 16. It lies in the center of the state. The region comprises twelve municipalities (see below).  It is largely rural.

Municipalities 
Almoloya de Juárez
Almoloya del Río
Calimaya
Chapultepec
Metepec
Mexicaltzingo
Rayón
San Antonio la Isla
Tenango del Valle
Toluca
Texcalyacac
Zinacantepec

References

Regions of the State of Mexico